Phanerosorus is a genus of ferns in the family Matoniaceae.

Species
, Plants of the World Online and the Checklist of Ferns and Lycophytes of the World accept the following species:
Phanerosorus major Diels
Phanerosorus sarmentosus (Baker) Copel.

References

Gleicheniales
Fern genera